The Israel Association for Automatic Control (IAAC) is a national member organization of the International Federation of Automatic Control (IFAC). IAAC was one of the first member organizations of IFAC, and was founded in the early sixties by control system researchers from the Technion – Israel Institute of Technology, and from Rafael Advanced Defense Systems Ltd.

The mission of IAAC is the advancement of science, applications, and education in the area of automatic control, with an emphasis of the needs of Israel. To meet this goal, IAAC pro-actively organizes conferences, lectures, courses, and workshops; promotes information exchange between the various organizations involved in automatic control; promotes co-operations between organizations involved in automatic control in Israel and abroad.

References

External links
 Israel Association for Automatic Control

Engineering organizations
Control engineering
Business organizations based in Israel